Matanuska-Susitna Borough School District (MSBSD) is a school district based in the city of Palmer, Alaska. It serves 40 schools across Mat-Su Borough, which each enroll from 15 to 1300 students. The estimated sum of the total number of students attending schools in this district is 15,969. MSBSD is the second-largest school district in Alaska, with the largest district being  Anchorage School District.

In the 2007-2008 school year, Matanuska-Susitna Borough School District had an expenditure of $150,531,684, which is a $9,426 expenditure for every student.

The current superintendent is Dr. Randy Trani.

History
In April 2020 the school district board deemed five books, Catch-22, The Great Gatsby, I Know Why the Caged Bird Sings, Invisible Man, and The Things They Carried, to be inappropriate for use in the classroom. Among the reasons cited were "anti-white" sentiments.  A local attorney responded with a "book challenge," asking students to read all five works. In May of that year the school board restored the books to the curriculum.

Schools

K-12 schools 
 Beryozova School, a public K-12 school in Willow
 Correspondence Study School, a public K-12 school in Wasilla
 Glacier View School, a public K-12 school
 Twindly Bridge Charter School, a public K-12 school, in Wasilla

7-12 schools 
 Susitna Valley High School, a public secondary school, serving grades 7–12, near Talkeetna

6-12 schools 
 Matanuska-Susitna Secondary School, a public secondary school, serving grades 6–12, in Palmer

High schools 
 Burchell High School, a public alternative school in Wasilla
 Colony High School, a public secondary school near Palmer
 Houston High School, a public secondary school in Houston
 Mat-Su Career and Technical High School, a public secondary school in Wasilla
 Palmer High School, a public secondary school in Palmer
 Valley Pathways High School, a public alternative school in Palmer
 Wasilla High School, a public 9–12 school in Wasilla

K-8 schools
 Academy Charter School, a charter school, serving grades K–8, in Palmer
 Fronteras Spanish Immersion Charter School K-8, a public charter school in Wasilla

Middle schools 
 Colony Middle School, a public middle school in Palmer
 Houston Middle School, a public middle school in Big Lake
 Palmer Middle School, a public middle school in Palmer
 Teeland Middle School, a public middle school in Wasilla
 Wasilla Middle School, a public middle school in Wasilla

Elementary schools 
 Big Lake Elementary School] in Big Lake
 Butte Elementary School in Palmer
 Cottonwood Creek Elementary School in Wasilla
 Dena'ina Elementary in Wasilla
 Finger Lake Elementary School in Wasilla
 Goose Bay Elementary School in Wasilla
 Iditarod Elementary School in Wasilla
 Larson Elementary School in Wasilla
 Machetanz Elementary School in Wasilla
 Meadow Lakes Elementary School in Wasilla
 Pioneer Peak Elementary School in Palmer
 Sherrod Elementary School in Palmer
 Snowshoe Elementary School in Wasilla
 Sutton Elementary School in Sutton
 Swanson Elementary School in Palmer
 Talkeetna Elementary School in Talkeetna
 Tanaina Elementary School in Wasilla
 Trapper Creek Elementary School in Trapper Creek
 Willow Elementary School in Willow

See also 
 List of school districts in Alaska

Notes

References

External links 
 Official website

School districts in Alaska
Education in Matanuska-Susitna Borough, Alaska